John Clarke Foote (1822–1895) was a politician in Queensland, Australia. He was a member of the Queensland Legislative Council.

Early life
John Clarke Foote was born on 10 July 1822 in Calne, Wiltshire, England, the son of Joseph Foote (a hat maker) and his wife Elizabeth (née Clarke). In January 1848, his father Joseph emigrated to Van Diemen's Land (Tasmania) as an agent of the Van Dieman's Land Colonial Mission Society and was appointed the resident Independent minister at Richmond within a few weeks of his arrival. Unfortunately, on 10 September 1848 Joseph died after being seized with an apoplectic fit while preaching the divine service.

John immigrated with his mother Elizabeth, his wife Mary Ann, his brother James Foote and 3 sisters, Clarissa, Lucy and Harriet on the Emigrant arriving in Moreton Bay on 12 August 1850. During the voyage, there was an outbreak of typhus and around 20 people died. The ship on arrival in Moreton Bay was placed under quarantine, and was not brought into Brisbane until 28 September 1850.

Business
John Clarke Foote came to Ipswich in about 1852 where he worked as a manager in the general store owned by Benjamin Cribb. In 1853, Benjamin Cribb married Clarissa Foote, the sister of John Clarke Foote. In 1854, Benjamin Cribb and John Clarke Foote went into partnership as Cribb & Foote, creating the major department store that stood on the corner of Bell and Brisbane Streets.

Politics
John Clarke Foote was appointed as a lifetime Member of the Queensland Legislative Council on 12 May 1877, an appointment that ended with his death on 18 August 1895.

Later life
John Clarke Foote died on 18 August 1895 at his residence on the corner of Thorn and South Streets, Ipswich and was buried in Ipswich General Cemetery. He had been suffering from brain disease for the previous 9 months and it had become acute in the previous 6 weeks.

References

External links
 Obituary: 

Members of the Queensland Legislative Council
1822 births
1895 deaths
People from Calne
English emigrants to Australia
19th-century Australian politicians
Pre-Separation Queensland